Hedenham is a civil parish in the English county of Norfolk.
For the purposes of local government, it falls within the district of South Norfolk.

The villages name means 'Hedena's homestead/village' or 'Hedena's hemmed-in land'.

Notes 

http://kepn.nottingham.ac.uk/map/place/Norfolk/Hedenham

External links

South Norfolk
Villages in Norfolk
Civil parishes in Norfolk